Amicus Plato, sed magis amica veritas is a Latin phrase, translating to "Plato is my friend, but truth is a better friend (literally: Plato is friend, but truth is more friend (to me than he is))."  Isaac Newton opened his 1661 Cambridge student notebook with the slogan reading: "Amicus Plato amicus Aristoteles magis amica veritas." Miguel de Cervantes popularized the redirection to Plato in Don Quixote, Part II, Chapter 51. Leonardo Tarán has traced the antecedents of Cervantes' adage in an eponymous 1984 paper. Logician Alfred Tarski excused his Platonism by amending the formula to Inimicus Plato sed magis inimica falsitas ("Plato is an enemy, but falsehood is a greater enemy").

Notes

References 
Henry Guerlac, "Amicus Plato and Other Friends", Journal of the History of Ideas, Vol. 39, No. 4 (Oct.-Dec., 1978), pp. 627–633.
Leonardo Tarán, "Amicus Plato, sed magis amica veritas: From Plato and Aristotle to Cervantes", Antike und Abendland 30, 1984, pp. 93–124; reprinted in his Collected Papers (1962-1999), Brill Academic Publishers, 2001, pp. 1–46.
James Otis, "A Vindication of the Conduct of the House of Representatives" 1762, The Preface, "Amicus Socrates, amicus Plato, sed magis Amica veritas."

Latin quotations
Latin philosophical phrases
Neoplatonism